Philochortus is a genus of lizards of the family Lacertidae. Species of this genus are distributed in Egypt, Algeria, Libya, Mali, Niger, Ethiopia, Djibouti, Eritrea, Somalia, Kenya, Yemen, and Saudi Arabia.

Etymology
Philochortus means grass-loving (Greek: philos = friend, chortos = grass). The common name of Philochortus species is therefore grass-loving lizards, or shield-backed ground lizards because of their typical back scalation and terrestrial habitat.

Diagnosis
Species of Philochortus are medium to large-sized lacertids with long cylindrical tails. The unregenerated tail is up to 3.25 times longer than head and body. Eyes with movable lids. The nostril is pierced between two shields and usually bordered by the first supralabial or narrowly separated from it. The collar is well marked. The ventral plates are smooth, feebly imbricate and arranged in 6 longitudinal series. The dorsal scales are smooth or keeled. Back with 2 to 6 longitudinal series of enlarged plate-like scales along the dorsal mid-line. This is the main difference to Latastia. Femoral pores are present on the inside of the thighs, more prominent in males. Tail base in males much broader than in females.

Habitat and natural history
The natural history of all species of Philochortus is only poorly known. Many of the species inhabit semiarid, arid or hyperarid regions, mountainous areas as well as plains from sea level up to 1500 m altitude (P. neumanni ). Most species prefer sparsely vegetated, open and sandy or fairly rocky localities (P. neumanni ) and can be found in Acacia-Commiphora deciduous bushland and semidesert bushland vegetation types. But P. zolii and P. neumanni can be found also in marginal unattended cultivated areas with Desmostachya bipinnata grass and other scrub and well vegetated natural habitats.

The species of Philochortus are diurnal, sun-loving active predators on insects and other arthropods, egg-laying  and terrestrial but P. zolii is an avid climber. The long stiff tail is aiding in balance on vegetation. They dig burrows in the soil below clumps of grasses or small bushes.

Species
The following seven species are recognized as being valid.
Philochortus hardeggeri  - Hardegger's orangetail lizard, Hardegger's shield-backed lizard
Philochortus intermedius  - southern orangetail lizard, Boulenger's shield-backed lizard
Philochortus neumanni  - Neumann's orangetail lizard
Philochortus phillipsi  - Phillips's shield-backed lizard
Philochortus rudolfensis  - southern shield-backed lizard
Philochortus spinalis  - Peters's shield-backed lizard, Eritrea orangetail lizard 
Philochortus zolii 

 

Nota bene: A binomial authority in parentheses indicates that the species was originally described in a genus other than Philochortus.

References

Further reading
Baha El Din S (2006). A Guide to the Reptiles and Amphibians of Egypt. Cairo and New York: The American University in Cairo Press.
Boulenger GA (1898). "On a Second Collection of Reptiles made by Mr. E. Lort-Phillips in Somaliland". The Annals and Magazine of Natural History, Seventh Series 2: 130-133. (Latastia phillipsii, new species, pp. 131–132).
Boulenger GA (1917). "On the lizards of the genus Philochortus Matschie". Proceedings of the Zoological Society of London 1917: 145-157 + Plates I-II. (Philochortus intermedius, new species, pp. 152–154 + Plate II, figures 3, 3a, 3b, 3c, 4).
Boulenger GA (1921). [https://archive.org/stream/monographoflacer02boul#page/n3/mode/2up Monograph of the Lacertidae. Volume II ]. London: Trustees of the British Museum (Natural History). viii + 451 pp. (Genus Philochortus, pp. 1-2; species of Philochortus, pp. 3-14).
Largen MJ, Spawls S (2006). "Lizards of Ethiopia (Reptilia Sauria): an annotated checklist, bibliography, gazetteer and identification key". Tropical Zoology 19: 21-109.
Matschie P (1893). "Über einige von Herrn Oscar Neumann bei Aden gesammelte u. beobachtete Säugethiere, Reptilien und Amphibien ". Sitzungs-Berichte der Gesellschaft Naturforschender Freunde zu Berlin 1893: 24-31. (Philochortus, new genus, p. 30; P. neumanni, new species, pp. 30–31). (in German).
Parker HW (1932). "Scientific results of the Cambridge Expedition to the East African Lakes, 1930-1.—5. Reptiles and Amphibians". The Journal of the Linnean Society of London. Zoology 38: 213-229. (Philocortus intermedius rudolfensis, new subspecies, p. 226).
Parker HW (1942). "The Lizards of British Somaliland". Bulletin of the Museum of Comparative Zoology at Harvard College 91 (1): 1-101.
Peters W (1874). "Über einige neue Reptilien (Lacerta, Eremias, Diploglossus, Euprepes, Lygosoma, Sepsina, Ablepharus, Simotes, Onychocephalus)". Monatsberichte der Königlichen Preussischen Akademie der Wissenschaften zu Berlin 1874: 368-377 + Plate. (Lacerta spinalis, new species, pp. 369–370 + Plate, figure 2). (in German).
Schleich HH, Kästle W, Kabisch K (1996). Amphibians and Reptiles of North Africa. Königstein: Koeltz Scientific Books. 630 pp. .
Scortecci G (1934). "Descrizione preliminare di una nuova specie del genere Philochortus (Philochortus zolii) della zona Gat (Missione della Reale Società Geografica)". Atti Soc. Italiana Sci. Nat. 73: 305-308. (Philochortus zolii, new species). (in Italian).
Spawls S, Howell KM, Drewes RC, Ashe J (2002). A Field Guide to the Reptiles of East Africa. San Diego, San Francisco, New York, Boston, London: Academic Press, Elsevier Science. 544 pp.
Steindachner F (1891). "Ueber neue und seltene Lacertiden aus der herpetologischen Sammlung des k. k. naturhistorischen Hofmuseums ". Annalen des Naturhistorischen Museums in Wien 6: 371-378 + Plates XI-XII. (Latastia hardeggeri, new species, pp. 371–373 + Plate XI, figures 1-3). (in German).

 
Lizard genera
Taxa named by Paul Matschie